The Hearst Expedition was an archaeological project led by the University of California to explore burial grounds at and around Qift, Egypt. The expedition spanned the years 1899–1905, and was named for Phoebe Hearst, mother of William Randolph Hearst, the newspaper magnate who funded it. George A. Reisner directed the expedition, and is credited with some of its most important finds, including the stela of Prince Wepemnofret and the Hearst Medical Papyrus.

References

Archaeological expeditions